Angoff is a surname. Notable people with the surname include:

Charles Angoff (1902–1979), American journalist
Charles Angoff Award
William H. Angoff (1919–1993), American testing expert